Thierry Vatrican (born 19 August 1975) is a Monegasque judoka and footballer who plays goalkeeper for Sun Casino. He competed at the 1996 Summer Olympics and the 2000 Summer Olympics.

References

External links
 

1975 births
Living people
Monegasque male judoka
Olympic judoka of Monaco
Judoka at the 1996 Summer Olympics
Judoka at the 2000 Summer Olympics
Place of birth missing (living people)
Monegasque footballers
Association football goalkeepers